Chapan-e Olya (also Romanized as Chāpān-e ‘Olyā and Chāpān ‘Olyá; also known as Chāpān and Chāpān-e Bālā) is a village in Emam Rural District, Ziviyeh District, Saqqez County, Kurdistan Province, Iran. At the 2006 census, its population was 184, in 44 families. The village is populated by Kurds.

References 

Towns and villages in Saqqez County
Kurdish settlements in Kurdistan Province